Bhale Donga is a 1989 Telugu-language action film produced by K. Devi Vara Prasad under the Devi Films banner, directed by A. Kodandarami Reddy. It stars Nandamuri Balakrishna, Vijayashanti  and music composed by Chakravarthy. The film was also dubbed into Hindi under the title Qaidi no.1. The film was recorded as a Hit at the box office.

Plot
The film begins with a swashbuckling thief, Surendra, also a master of disguise, who always targets Vidhatha, dictator of the city, and he is being tracked down by SP Indrani, an efficient Police officer. Surendra contracts a multi-specialty hospital for work free of cost with all this money. Dr. Rekha, the younger sister of Indrani, is inspired by Surendra's good heart and starts loving him. After several other successful attempts, one day Surendra is caught by Rekha and when she questions him, he then reveals his past. His father an honest person, had collected donations from the people of the town for the construction of the hospital, with his partner Vidhatha. 

Vidhatha had double-crossed him and stolen the entire account, placing the blame on his father, which led to his suicide. That is why Surendra is taking revenge against Vidhatha. In another attempt, Surendra is trapped and arrested by Indrani, she tells him that he had been doing this for his welfare only because she has a personal fight with Vidhatha, whose actual name is Vijay, who was her ex-lover, who had killed her parents and escaped from imprisonment. Now Surendra and Indrani join together. Whether they will be able to take revenge against Vidhatha, and whether Surendra will be able complete the hospital forms the rest of the story.

Cast
Nandamuri Balakrishna as Surendra
Vijayashanti as Rekha
Rao Gopal Rao as Viswanatham Master
Sharada as SP Indrani
Mohan Babu as Manmadha Rao
Charan Raj as Vidhata / Vijay
Ranganath as Surendra's father 
Annapurna as Purna
Chalapathi Rao as Vidhata's henchmen
Brahmanandam as Surendra's henchmen
Sri Lakshmi as Coolie
Hema as Hema
P. L. Narayana as Silpi Veerachari
Sakshi Ranga Rao as Doctor

Soundtrack

Music composed by Chakravarthy. Lyrics were written by Veturi. Music released on LEO Audio Company.

References

External links

1989 films
Films directed by A. Kodandarami Reddy
Films scored by K. Chakravarthy
1980s Telugu-language films